"Radio Silence" is a song by English electronic music producer and singer-songwriter James Blake. It was released on 5 May 2016 as the third single from Blake’s third album, The Colour in Anything.

Release and reception 
The song was released a day prior to the release of The Colour in Anything  through Polydor Records, alongside two other tracks from the album.

”Radio Silence” was met with positive reviews from music critics. Pitchfork deemed it as “Best New Track”, praising the instrumentalism and vocalism of the track.

Track listing

References 

2016 songs
Songs written by James Blake (musician)
James Blake (musician) songs